John Michael Schmitz (born March 19, 1999) is an American football center. He played college football for the Minnesota Golden Gophers, where he was named a first-team All-American.

Early life and high school career
Schmitz grew up in Flossmoor, Illinois, and attended Homewood-Flossmoor High School. Schmitz initially committed to play college football at Western Michigan under coach P. J. Fleck. He later flipped his commitment to Minnesota after Fleck was hired there.

College career
Schmitz redshirted his true freshman season at Minnesota. He played in all 13 of the Golden Gophers' games as a redshirt freshman, appearing mostly on special teams. Schmitz was named Minnesota's starting center entering his redshirt junior season and was named honorable mention All-Big Ten Conference. He was named second team All-Big Ten in 2021. Schmitz used the extra year of eligibility granted to college athletes in 2020 due to the COVID-19 pandemic and returned to Minnesota for 2022.

References

External links
Minnesota Golden Gophers bio

Living people
American football centers
Minnesota Golden Gophers football players
Players of American football from Illinois
1999 births
All-American college football players